Monsampolo del Tronto is a comune (municipality) in the Province of Ascoli Piceno in the Italian region Marche, located about  south of Ancona and about  southwest of Ascoli Piceno.

Monsampolo del Tronto borders the following municipalities: Acquaviva Picena, Castorano, Controguerra, Monteprandone, Offida, Spinetoli.

References

Cities and towns in the Marche